Ville de Paris was a large three-decker French ship of the line that became famous as the flagship of De Grasse during the American Revolutionary War.

Career 
Originally laid down in 1757 as the 90-gun Impétueux, she was funded by the City of Paris and renamed Ville de Paris in 1762 as a result of the don des vaisseaux, Duc de Choiseul’s campaign to raise funds for the navy from the cities and provinces of France.

She was completed in 1764 as a 90-gun first rate, just too late to serve in the Seven Years' War. She was one of the first three-deckers to be completed for the French navy since the 1720s.

In 1778, on the French entry into the American Revolutionary War she was commissioned at Brest, joining the fleet as the flagship of Guichen. In July she fought in the indecisive Battle of Ushant (1778).

At some point during the next two years, she had an additional 14 small guns mounted on her previously unarmed quarterdeck, making her a 104-gun ship.

In 1779, she was the flagship of a division under Duchaffault, part of the Armada of 1779.

In March 1781 she sailed for the West Indies as flagship of a fleet of 20 ships of the line under De Grasse. She then fought at the Battle of Fort Royal and the Battle of the Chesapeake, under Captain Cresp de Saint-Césaire.

In 1782, she fought in the Battle of St. Kitts as De Grasse's flagship.

At the Battle of the Saintes on 12 April 1782, the British fleet under Admiral Sir George Rodney defeated the French fleet under the Comte de Grasse, and captured Ville de Paris.
No longer capable of sailing, with no masts and no rudder, the stricken ship was towed by HMS Namur after the battle, being taken to Port Royal, Jamaica for repair.

The ship sank in September 1782 with other ships including HMS Glorieux when the 1782 Central Atlantic hurricane hit the fleet off Newfoundland Admiral Graves was leading back to England. Ville de Paris sank with the loss of all 500 hands but one, thereafter known as "Wilson of the Ville de Paris".

A ship of the line of the Royal Navy was named after her: HMS Ville de Paris, launched in 1795.

Legacy
Two of her guns were retained in Jamaica, they now flank the Rodney memorial in Spanish Town, Jamaica.

Sources and references 
 Notes

Citations

References
 
 
 
 

Ships of the line of the French Navy
Shipwrecks in the Atlantic Ocean
Maritime incidents in 1782
Don des vaisseaux
Ships built in France